Delta Faucet Company is an American manufacturer of plumbing fixtures.  It is a subsidiary of Masco Corporation.  It manufactures and markets faucets, bath/shower fixtures, and toilets under the Delta, Kraus, Peerless, and Brizo brand names.

History 
Delta Faucet Company was originally owned by Masco Screw Corporation, which was founded in Detroit in 1929 by Armenian immigrant Alex Manoogian.  In 1952, an eager inventor brought Manoogian his latest invention, a one-handled faucet that mixed both hot and cold water with a ball-valve.  Unfortunately it leaked, but Manoogian saw potential.  He therefore bought the faucet and its rights, improved it, and released it.  The faucet remains successful, although other companies soon designed other single-handle faucets that didn't infringe Delta's patents.  Hardware stores still stock internal parts for these faucets, both the 1952 and the 1962 design, although they don't all carry the complete faucets.

The brand name Delta came about because the operating motion of the handle resembled the Greek letter of the same name.

The company was started in 1954 as a Masco subsidiary in the Detroit, Michigan region.  In 1958, the company opened a manufacturing facility in Greensburg, Indiana.  In 1976, another facility in Chickasha, Oklahoma was opened (The Chickasha facility closed in 2006), followed by Jackson, Tennessee in 1995.  The company also operates manufacturing facilities in Lapeer, Michigan, Morgantown, Kentucky, and one outside the United States in Panyu, China.  Delta Faucet Company is headquartered in Indianapolis, Indiana.

In 2011, Delta introduced the Touch2O and Touch2O.xt series of kitchen and bathroom faucets, the former with touch sensors and the latter designed for hands-free operation with capacitive sensors.

In 2019, Delta introduced the VoiceIQ kitchen faucet, which can respond to voice commands via Amazon Alexa or Google Assistant. All Touch2O kitchen faucets manufactured since 2018 can be retrofitted with the VoiceIQ module to add VoiceIQ functionality to existing Touch2O faucets. Competitors include the U by Moen and the Kohler Sensate with Konnect smart kitchen faucets.

In 2020, Delta acquired the Kraus brand of plumbing fixtures, founded in 2007.

Primary competitors
 American Standard Brands
 Kohler Co.
 Moen Incorporated
 Pfister (firm)

See also 

 Plumbing

References

Plumbing
Building materials companies of the United States
Manufacturing companies based in Indianapolis